The peroxomonosulfate ion, is a sulfur oxoanion.  It is sometimes referred to as the persulfate ion, but this term also refers to the peroxydisulfate ion, .

Its other IUPAC names are sulfuroperoxoate and trioxidoperoxidosulfate(2−).

Compounds containing peroxomonosulfate
 Na2SO5
 KHSO5

See also
 Peroxymonosulfuric acid

References

Sulfur oxyanions